Hum Tum Aur Quarantine (transl. We You and Quarantine) is an Indian comedy series starring Bharti Singh and Haarsh Limbachiyaa that aired on Colors TV. Hum Tum Aur Quarantine started on 13 April 2020 on Colors TV.

Concept
Bharti Singh told Mumbai Mirror online, "With everyone sitting at home during the lockdown and finding new ways of entertaining themselves, we thought it was the best time to put our talent to use. The series has short gags that will focus on fun activities during our lockdown. It is entirely shot by Haarsh and myself from home. We also want to tell everyone to stay indoors, stay safe and enjoy our new series."

Cast 
Bharti Singh
Haarsh Limbachiyaa

Special appearances
Sidharth Shukla
Aditya Narayan
Karan Patel 
Karishma Tanna
Balraj Syal

References 

2020 Indian television series debuts
Hindi-language television shows
Colors TV original programming
Indian comedy television series
2020 Indian television series endings